Proma Hypermarket as an Iranian supermarket chain is launched in three cities of Iran including Mashhad, Tehran, and Qazvin. 
Proma Hypermarket in Mashhad is a 420,000 m² complex comprising a shopping mall located near Janbaz Square, Mashhad, Iran. It has about 430 shops on four and one-half floors.

External links
 Official website

Shopping malls in Iran
Shopping malls established in 2007
Retail companies established in 2007
Buildings and structures in Mashhad
Supermarkets of Iran